Camalexin (3-thiazol-2-yl-indole) is a simple indole alkaloid found in the plant Arabidopsis thaliana and other crucifers.  The secondary metabolite functions as a phytoalexin to deter bacterial and fungal pathogens.

Structure
The base structure of camalexin consists of an indole ring derived from tryptophan.   The ethanamine moiety attached to the 3 position of the indole ring is subsequently rearranged into a thiazole ring.

Biosynthesis
While the biosynthesis of camalexin in planta has not been fully elucidated, most of the enzymes involved in the pathway are known and involved in a metabolon complex.  The pathway starts with a tryptophan precursor which is subsequently oxidized by two cytochrome P450 enzymes.  The indole-3-acetaldoxime is then converted to indole-3-acetonitrile by another cytochrome P450, CYP71A13.  A glutathione conjugate followed by a subsequent unknown enzyme is needed to form dihydrocamalexic acid.  A final decarboxylation step by cytochrome P450 CYP71B15, also called phytoalexin deficient4 (PAD3) results in the final product, camalexin.

Biological activity
Camalexin is cytotoxic against aggressive prostate cancer cell lines in vitro.

References

Indole alkaloids
2-Thiazolyl compounds